The Torch River is a short river in the Northern Lower Peninsula of the U.S. state of Michigan. At  in length, the river connects Torch Lake to Lake Skegemog, and is a crucial link in the Elk River Chain of Lakes Watershed. The river is divided along its entire length between Antrim and Kalkaska counties. The northern source of the river is home to a DNR Access Site.

See also 
 Elk Lake

References 

Northern Michigan
Rivers of Michigan
Rivers of Antrim County, Michigan
Rivers of Kalkaska County, Michigan
Geography of Antrim County, Michigan
Geography of Kalkaska County, Michigan
Tributaries of Lake Michigan